Bhajji State was a princely state in India during the period of the British Raj. Its capital was Suni. The former princely state is now part of the Indian state of Himachal Pradesh.

References

States and territories disestablished in 1947
Princely states of Himachal Pradesh
1947 disestablishments in India
Rajputs
1948 disestablishments in India